Christian Methodist Senior High School is a co-educational, municipal secondary school located in Weija, Ga South Municipal District, Ghana.

History
The school was established in September 1960 by the Late Rev. Gordon Nii Akwei Quaye of blessed memory with funding from the United States-based Christian Methodist Episcopal Church. The school was initially located, in rented premises, at Asylum Down, near the Kwame Nkrumah Circle. Originally a private institution, it was absorbed into the public educational system in September 1965. The school moved to the present site, in Weija, in September 2009. The school is a co-educational school. In 2021 Yen News listed the school as one of the top ten senior high schools in the Greater Accra area.

In 2015 110 acres of land belonging to the school were the subject of an invasion by squatters. By 2018 only five acres of the 110 acres set aside for the school were available for its use. During the 2020 Ghanaian elections, a polling station at the school was the site of disturbances between supporters of the rival NPP and NDC over an alleged attempt to sway voters by distributing food.

Notable alumni
 Amandzeba Nat Ekow Brew, Ghanaian musician
 Anas Aremeyaw Anas, Ghanaian journalist
Gifty Kwofie, Ghana Member of Parliament, 2000 and 2008

References 

High schools in Ghana
Methodist schools
Educational institutions established in 1960
1960 establishments in Ghana
Greater Accra Region